Albert Powers may refer to:

 Albert E. Powers (1816–1910), acting president of Rensselaer Polytechnic Institute
 Albert Theodore Powers (born 1953), lawyer, business executive, and investor based in Hong Kong